California Autumn is an album by American guitarist Tony Rice, released in 1975. Rice's backup band includes members of Seldom Scene, as well as other musicians including Jerry Douglas and Ricky Skaggs.

Track listing 
 "California Autumn" (Tony Rice) – 3:22
 "Bullet Man" (Tony Rice) – 2:53
 "Mr. Poverty" (Larry Rice) – 2:51
 "Billy In The Low Ground" (Traditional) – 2:41
 "Red Haired Boy" (Traditional) – 3:22
 "Good Woman's Love" (Cy Coben) – 3:07
 "You Don't Know My Mind" (Jimmie Skinner) – 2:58
 "Alone And Forsaken" (Hank Williams) – 3:23
 "Bugle Call Rag" (Billy Meyers, Jack Pettis, Elmer Schoebel) – 2:44
 "Georgia on My Mind" (Hoagy Carmichael, Stuart Gorrell) – 3:15
 "Scarborough Fair" (Traditional) – 2:38
 "Beaumont Rag" (Traditional) – 3:15

Personnel 
 Tony Rice – guitar, vocals
 Larry Rice – mandolin
 Ricky Skaggs – fiddle, mandolin, violin, vocals 
 J. D. Crowe – banjo 
 Ben Eldridge – banjo 
 Jerry Douglas – dobro
 Mike Auldridge – dobro
 Tom Gray – bass
 John Starling – guitar, vocals
Production notes
 John Starling – producer, mixing
 George Massenburg – engineer
 Fred Carlson – design

References 

1975 albums
Tony Rice albums
Rebel Records albums
Songs about California